Albert Blellock Hudson (August 21, 1875 – January 6, 1947) was a politician, lawyer and judge from Manitoba, Canada.  He served in the Legislative Assembly of Manitoba from 1914 to 1920 as a member of the Manitoba Liberal Party, and was a cabinet minister in the government of Tobias Norris.  He later served in the House of Commons of Canada from 1921 to 1925, as a member of the Liberal Party of Canada.  In 1936, Hudson was appointed to the Supreme Court of Canada.

Hudson was born in Pembroke, Ontario, the son of Albert Hudson and Elizabeth Blellock, and was educated in Portage la Prairie and Winnipeg.  He received a law degree from the University of Manitoba in 1898 and was called to the Manitoba bar the next year. He founded the firm of Hudson, Ormond & Marlatt, with which he practised law for thirty-one years.  In 1914, he was named King's Counsel. Hudson married Mary R. Russell in 1908. In religion, Hudson was a Presbyterian.

He was first elected to the Manitoba legislature in the provincial election of 1914, defeating incumbent Conservative Lendrum McMeans by 998 votes in the Winnipeg South "A" constituency.  The Conservatives won this election, and Hudson sat with his party on the opposition benches.

The Conservative administration of Rodmond Roblin was forced to resign from office in 1915 amid a corruption scandal, and the Liberals were called on to form a new government.  Norris was sworn in as Premier of Manitoba on May 15, 1915, and named Hudson as his Attorney-General and Minister of Telephones and Telegraphs.  A new election was called, which the Liberals won in a landslide.  Hudson was easily returned in Winnipeg South "A", and held both of his cabinet portfolios until resigning from office November 10, 1917.  According to a Winnipeg Free Press report, Hudson had wanted to resign for several months to better oversee his personal business.  He served as a backbencher for the remainder of legislative sitting, and did not seek re-election in the 1920 campaign.

Hudson then moved to national politics, seeking election to the Canadian House of Commons in the 1921 federal election.  He defeated Conservative George Nelson Jackson by 2,866 votes to win the Winnipeg South riding, and served as a backbench supporter of William Lyon Mackenzie King's government for the next four years.  He did not seek re-election in the 1925 campaign.

On March 24, 1936, Hudson was appointed a Puisne Justice of the Supreme Court of Canada.  He held this position until his death in 1947.

Archives 
There is an Albert Blellock Hudson fonds at Library and Archives Canada. Archival reference number is R4653.

References

External links
 Supreme Court of Canada biography
 

Justices of the Supreme Court of Canada
Liberal Party of Canada MPs
Members of the House of Commons of Canada from Manitoba
Manitoba Liberal Party MLAs
1875 births
1947 deaths
People from Pembroke, Ontario
Members of the Executive Council of Manitoba
Canadian King's Counsel
Robson Hall alumni